Bae Jong-min (born 13 February 1971) is a North Korean former footballer. He represented North Korea on at least one occasion in 1992.

Career statistics

International

References

1971 births
Living people
North Korean footballers
North Korea international footballers
Association football forwards
1992 AFC Asian Cup players